Lieutenant General George Price Hays (September 27, 1892 – August 7, 1978) was a United States Army general who served during World War I and World War II. He earned the Medal of Honor as a young artillery officer during the Second Battle of the Marne in World War I. During World War II, he commanded the 10th Mountain Division in the last few months of the Italian Campaign.

Military career
Hays was born on September 27, 1892, in China, where his parents worked as Presbyterian missionaries. He was raised in El Reno, Oklahoma, and attended Oklahoma A&M College (now Oklahoma State University) before leaving school to enlist for World War I.  He was commissioned a second lieutenant in 1917, and by July 14, 1918, was a first lieutenant serving in France with the 10th Field Artillery Regiment, 3rd Division. On that day, during the Second Battle of the Marne near Greves Farm, his unit came under a heavy German artillery barrage and the communication lines were destroyed. Despite the intense fire, Hays rode on horseback between his unit, the command post, and two French batteries for the rest of that day and the next. Although he was severely wounded and had seven horses shot out from under him, his efforts contributed to the halt of the German advance. For these actions, he was awarded the Medal of Honor the next year, in 1919.

World War II
Remaining in the army during the interwar period, Hays, who was promoted to lieutenant colonel on August 18, 1940, commanded the 99th Field Artillery (Pack) from 1940 to 1941; among his subordinates was Captain William Orlando Darby, who went on to found the U.S. Army Rangers.

After the United States' entry into World War II, Hays, promoted to the temporary rank of colonel on December 24, 1941, participated in the Battle of Monte Cassino in early 1944. He commanded the 2nd Infantry Division's artillery on Omaha Beach during the Normandy landings in June of that year.

In late November 1944, after returning to the U.S., Hays, promoted to temporary major general on January 3, 1945, assumed command of the 10th Mountain Division when its CG, Major General Lloyd E. Jones, fell ill. After training, the division arrived in Italy in January and fought throughout the spring offensive. On April 24, 1945, Colonel William Darby was assigned as Hays' Assistant Division Commander, but was killed in action six days later.

After the end of the war in Europe, Hays became High Commissioner for the US Occupation Zone in Germany from 1949, and assumed command of the occupation forces or U.S. Forces Austria (USFA) in April 1952, in Salzburg. He retired from the military in 1953, having reached the rank of lieutenant general.

Medal of Honor citation
Rank and organization: First Lieutenant, United States Army, 10th Field Artillery, 3d Division.
Place and date: Near Greves Farm, France, 14 – July 15, 1918.
Entered service at: Okarche, Oklahoma.
Born: September 27, 1892, China.
General Orders No.34. War Department, 1919.

Citation:

See also

List of Medal of Honor recipients for World War I

References

External links

Generals of World War II

|-

|-

1892 births
1978 deaths
United States Army Field Artillery Branch personnel
United States Army Medal of Honor recipients
Foreign-born Medal of Honor recipients
United States Army personnel of World War I
Burials at Arlington National Cemetery
World War I recipients of the Medal of Honor
People from Yantai
United States Army generals of World War II
United States Army generals
Oklahoma State University alumni
Recipients of the Distinguished Service Medal (US Army)
Recipients of the Silver Star
Recipients of the Legion of Merit